Saint Andrews  is a town in Charlotte County, New Brunswick, Canada. The historic town is a national historic site of Canada, bearing many characteristics of a typical 18th century British colonial settlement, including the original grid layout with its market square, and the classical architecture.

Although often shortened in non-official sources to St. Andrews, the town's legal name is spelt Saint Andrews, and appears as such on the town's website; St. Andrews by-the-Sea is a brand used for tourism purposes by the local Chamber of Commerce.

On 1 January 2023, Saint Andrews annexed the local service district of Bayside and Chamcook. Revised census information has not been released.

History
The site of the town was named Qunnnoskwamk'ook, meaning long gravel bar in the Malecite-Passamaquoddy language. The present name was given by a French missionary who landed at the site on Saint Andrew's Day. At the eastern end the town is a midden, a pile of shells and other refuse that accumulated over two thousand years due to year-round activity of the Passamaquoddy. It is today a provincial heritage site.

The site was settled in 1783 by Penobscot Loyalists.
The town's street grid was designed by Charles Morris and was laid out at that time and persists today. Except for the shoreline Water Street, street names have royal or colonial associations (Parr Street, Carleton Street and Montague Street are all named after Governors. These streets cross thirteen streets named after the children of George III.). Also typical of British colonial settlement of the time are the defensive sites, public spaces, and delineation of the town.

Between 1820 and 1860, the port of Saint Andrews welcomed Irish immigrants. They were first quarantined at Hospital Island, in Passamaquoddy Bay. At the 1851 census, more than 50% of the town's population had been born in Ireland.

The Pendlebury Lighthouse, also known as the St. Andrews North Point Lighthouse, was built in 1833 at the tip of the peninsula. It was deactivated in 1938, and has since been restored and registered as a Canadian historic place.

In 1840, the Charlotte County Court House was built, and was used continually until 2016.

In the late 1800s and early 1900s, St. Andrews became a seaside resort for people from Montreal and Boston who were seeking to escape the summer heat. The town's first seaside hotel, the Argyll, opened in 1881. It was followed in 1889 by The Algonquin, a resort on a hill overlooking the town, which became Canada's first seaside resort. The Argyll burned down in 1892 and was never rebuilt while the Algonquin burned in 1914 and was rebuilt one year later. The lifestyle of wealthy summer visitors is commemorated at the Ross Memorial Museum.

A federal marine research facility, the St. Andrews Biological Station, was established in 1908 and the Huntsman Marine Science Centre in 1969.

The town was designated a national historic site in 1998.

Geography

Saint Andrews is at the southern tip of a peninsula, extending into Passamaquoddy Bay. The waterfront faces Saint Andrews Harbour and the Western Channel, which is formed by Navy Island. The harbour is at the mouth of the St. Croix River. 

The town is directly opposite the community of Robbinston, Maine, 2 kilometres to the west across the river mouth, and 53 km by road.

Ministers Island is east of the town and is accessible by road at low tide only.

Demographics 

Transportation
Despite its proximity to the Canada–United States border, the nearest border crossings are 30 km away at St. Stephen or via a ferry service at Deer Island.

The only way into or out of Saint Andrews by land is via Route 127, which runs directly through the town. It meets Route 1 on either end of the town.

Media
A local community channel, CHCO-TV, serves the Saint Andrews and Charlotte County area. The station launched in 1993 on cable television, and began broadcasting over the air in 2006.

Education
NBCC St. Andrews
Vincent Massey Elementary School (K-5)
Sir James Dunn Academy (6-12)

Gallery

See also
List of historic places in St. Andrews
List of people from Charlotte County

References

External links

Communities in Charlotte County, New Brunswick
Towns in New Brunswick
Populated coastal places in Canada
Lighthouses in New Brunswick